Karen Marin (born 12 May 1999) is a Luxembourgish footballer who plays as a midfielder and has appeared for the Luxembourg women's national team.

Career
Marin has been capped for the Luxembourg national team, appearing for the team during the 2019 FIFA Women's World Cup qualifying cycle.

References

External links
 
 
 

1999 births
Living people
Luxembourgian women's footballers
Luxembourg women's international footballers
Women's association football midfielders